Ega, also known as Egwa and Diès, is a West African language spoken in south-central Ivory Coast. It is of uncertain affiliation and has variously been classified as Kwa or an independent branch of Niger-Congo.

Demographics
Ega is spoken in 21 villages near Gly in Diès Canton, Gôh-Djiboua District, Ivory Coast (Bole-Richard 1983: 359). Some villages are Broudougou, Gly, Dairo, Didizo, and Douzaroko.
The Ega people are increasing in number, though some are shifting to Dida through intermarriage.

Documentation
A language documentation fieldwork project on Ega was conducted by a team from Universität Bielefeld, Germany (Dafydd Gibbon) and Université Houphouet Boigny, Abidjan, Côte d'Ivoire (Firmin Ahoua) from 2000 to 2003 in cooperation with York University, Canada (Bruce Connell).

Classification
Ega is possibly a divergent Western Kwa language within the Niger–Congo language family spoken in Ivory Coast. It does not appear to belong to any of the traditional branches of Niger–Congo. Though traditionally assumed to be one of the Kwa languages, Roger Blench (2004) conservatively classified it as a separate branch of the Atlantic–Congo family, pending a demonstration that it is actually related to the Kwa or Volta–Niger languages. However, Blench (2017) classified Ega as a fully Western Kwa language that has borrowed from Kru, Gur, and Mande.

Cultural and economic context 
Like other Western Kwa languages, traditional story-telling among the Ega people has a fairly strict schedule: after an introduction by the narrator, a well-defined role in the village, the narration proceeds, punctuated by responder's interjection [sɛsɛ], and interspersed with song interludes with the call and response structure of work songs.

The economy of the Ega community is partly horticultural, partly dependent on plantation work. Hunting is practised with nets which are used to enclose an area of several hundred square meters, within which small game such as agouti (Thryonomys swinderianus) are cornered by a group of beaters. The nets resemble the local canoe trawling nets used on the southern Côte d'Ivoire coast about 100km further south, and possibly indicate a history of coastal migration.

Phonology 
Ega has twenty-seven consonants. Its stops have a three-way contrast between voiceless, voiced, and implosive. 

There are nine vowels, with ATR contrast: /i̙/, /i̘/, /u̙/, /u̘/, /e̙/, /e̘/, /o̙/, /o̘/, and /a/.

There are three tones: high, mid, and low.

References

Blench, Roger. 2004. The Ega Language of Côte d'Ivoire: Etymologies and Implications for Classification.

Niger–Congo languages
Languages of Ivory Coast